The 2013 Delray Beach International Tennis Championships was a professional men's tennis tournament played on hard courts. It was the 21st edition of the tournament which was part of the World Tour 250 series of the 2013 ATP World Tour. It took place in Delray Beach, United States between February 25 and March 3, 2013. Unseeded Ernests Gulbis, who entered the main draw as a qualifier, won the singles title.

Singles main-draw entrants

Seeds

 Rankings are as of February 18, 2013.

Other entrants
The following players received wildcards into the singles main draw:
  James Blake
  Sam Querrey
  Jack Sock

The following players received entry from the qualifying draw:
  Ernests Gulbis
  Daniel Muñoz de la Nava
  Bobby Reynolds
  Tim Smyczek

The following player received entry as lucky loser:
  Ričardas Berankis

Withdrawals
Before the tournament
  Marin Čilić (fatigue)
  Mardy Fish (heart problems)
  Lukáš Lacko
  Feliciano López (arm injury)
  Gaël Monfils
  Grega Žemlja

Retirements
  Kei Nishikori (side injury)
  Michael Russell (leg injury)
  Igor Sijsling (ankle injury)

Doubles main-draw entrants

Seeds

 Rankings are as of February 18, 2013.

Other entrants
The following pairs received wildcards into the doubles main draw:
  James Blake /  Jack Sock
  Matthew Ebden /  Michael Russell

Withdrawals
Before the tournament
  Igor Sijsling (ankle injury)

Finals

Singles

 Ernests Gulbis defeated  Édouard Roger-Vasselin, 7–6(7–3), 6–3

Doubles

 James Blake /  Jack Sock defeated  Max Mirnyi /  Horia Tecău, 6–4, 6–4

References

External links
Official website

Delray Beach Open
Delray Beach International Tennis Championships
Delray Beach International Tennis Championships
Delray Beach International Tennis Championships
Delray Beach International Tennis Championships
Delray Beach International Tennis Championships